Diving was contested at the 2017 Summer Universiade from August 20 to 27 at the Aquatics Palace in Taipei, Taiwan.

Participating nations
A total of 106 athletes from 24 nations is being competing in diving at the 2017 Summer Universiade:

 
 
 
 
  (H)

Schedule 
All times are Taiwan Standard Time (UTC+08:00)

Medal summary

Medal table

Men's events

Women's events

Mixed

References

External links
2017 Summer Universiade – Diving
Result book – Diving

 
2017 in diving
2017 Summer Universiade events
Diving at the Summer Universiade